Pitch Yarn of Matter (PYM) is a synthpop project by Brazilian electronic musician Marcelo Gallo that released two studio albums in the 1990s as well as a number of tracks that found their way onto electronic music compilations. 

In 1994, during a tour of the German band Second Decay, Michael Budde, proprietor of the Subtronic record label invited PYM to record their first album in Germany, making PYM the first Brazilian synthpop band to appear on the international market. In 1996, Marcelo Gallo decided to put the project to rest in order to be able to concentrate fully on his other project, Nude.

Influences include Gary Numan, Depeche Mode, Ultravox and others.

Discography
 Signs In Our Minds (1995)
 Strange Body (1996)

References
Fiberonline biography page on Marcelo Gallo / PYM

Synthpop groups
Musical groups established in 1993
Musical groups disestablished in 1996